The connection between colonialism and genocide has been explored in academic research. According to historian Patrick Wolfe, "[t]he question of genocide is never far from discussions of settler colonialism." Historians have commented that although colonialism does not necessarily directly involve genocide, research suggests that the two share a connection.    

Colonialism has been reinforced during various periods in history, even during progressive eras such as the Enlightenment. The Enlightenment, a period in the history of 17th and 18th Century Europe which was marked by dedication to progressive reform, natural social hierarchies were reinforced, Europeans who were educated, white, and native-born were considered high-class and less-educated, non-European people were considered low-class. These natural hierarchies were reinforced by progressives such as Marquis de Condorcet, a French mathematician, who believed that slaves were savages due to their lack of modern practices, despite the fact that he advocated the abolition of slavery.  First, the colonization process usually works to attack the homes of those who are being targeted. Typically, the people who are subjected to colonizing practices are portrayed as lacking modernity, because they and the colonialists do not have the same level of education or technology. 

The term genocide was coined in the 20th century by Raphael Lemkin to describe the Armenian genocide, although genocides have been committed since ancient times. Years later, the term was unanimously accepted by the United Nations and it was defined as an internationally illegal practice as a part of Resolution 96 in 1946. Various definitions of genocide exist. However, the Convention of Genocide has defined genocide as “acts committed with intent to destroy, in whole or in part, a national, ethnical, racial or religious group.” It is important to note that all definitions of genocide involve ethnicity, race, or religion as a motivational factor.

The example of Tasmania is cited, where white settlers wiped out indigenous Tasmanians, an event which is genocide by definition as well as an event which is a result of settler colonialism. Additionally, instances of colonialism and genocide in California and Hispaniola are cited below. The instance in California references the colonization and genocide of indigenous tribes by euro-Americans during the gold rush period. The example in Hispaniola discusses the island's colonization by Columbus and other Spaniards and the genocide inflicted on the native Taino people.

Researched examples of genocide linked to colonialism 
 Another example of colonialism and Genocide is the genocide which was committed against the Taino tribe on Hispaniola after the arrival of Christopher Columbus and other Spanish colonizers. Columbus and his crew arrived on the island of Haiti in December 1492. Initially leaving 39 Spaniards behind, Columbus left and a year later, he returned with more Spaniards in order to complete his conquest of the Dominican Republic. There are no exact tallies of how many Taino people inhabited Hispaniola when Columbus arrived on it. However, it is estimated that the number of Taino people who lived on Hispaniola was at least hundreds of thousands and it may have been up to a million or more. However, during the 25 years when the Spanish colonized the islands of Hispaniola, the Taino people were murdered, subjected to slavery, and by the year 1514, only 32,000 Taino people remained alive. 
 Black War of Tasmania, 1820s–1832. This was a guerrilla war fought between European settlers and Aboriginal Tasmanians, which resulted in the deaths of nearly 900 Aboriginal locals and the near extinction of the island's Aboriginal population.
 According to Jack Norton, a Hupa and Cherokee scholar, the colonization of California was attributed to Manifest Destiny, and the success of European colonizers in the West was attributed to the genocide of indigenous peoples. In a government-sponsored move to California, European colonizers emigrated west to further colonize the north American continent due to the discovery of gold in California. Upon arriving, Brendan Lindsay, an American behavioral scientist, notes that the euro-American group encountered nearly 150,000 indigenous tribes, and colonizers worked to drive them away, murder them, or have them collected by militiamen or vigilante forces. As the gold rush ended and as euro-American colonizers began to cultivate the land and create democracy in California, the treatment of indigenous tribes became much worse. The first California Governor, Peter H. Burnett, declared that a “war of extermination” should be waged against Indians, the war was recounted by numerous newspapers which were published at that time.
 According to the Tibetan Government in Exile (TGIE), during the early years of the rule of the Chinese administration in Tibet, an estimated 1.2 million Tibetans died between 1951 and 1984. Tibet expert Barry Sautman considers this number highly "inaccurate," because there is "no credible evidence of ongoing mass killing, physically enforced birth control, or forced intermarriage in Tibet." Sautman also challenges the notion that Chinese practices in Tibet can be considered genocidal or colonial, stating that "Tibet's non-colonial nature can be derived from the nature of modern colonialism" and citing the political and legal equality of Tibetans under the current administration.

See also 

 Genocide of indigenous peoples

References

Bibliography 

 
 
 
 
 
 
 
 
 
 
 Melber, H. (2017). Explorations into modernity, colonialism and genocide: Revisiting the past in the present. Acta Academica, 49(1). https://doi.org/10.18820/24150479/aa49i1.3
 Kaitlin Reed. (2020). We Are a Part of the Land and the Land Is Us: Settler Colonialism, Genocide & Healing in California. Humboldt Journal of Social Relations, 42, 27–49.https://digitalcommons.humboldt.edu/cgi/viewcontent.cgi?article=1131&context=hjsr
 Schimmer, R. (1492, January 1). Yale University. Hispaniola | Genocide Studies Program. Retrieved October 9, 2022, from https://gsp.yale.edu/case-studies/colonial-genocides-project/hispaniola
 Lindsay, B. C. (2013). Humor and dissonance in California’s Native American genocide. American Behavioral Scientist, 58(1), 97–123. https://doi.org/10.1177/0002764213495034

Colonialism
Genocide
Genocide of indigenous peoples